Exocrine glands are glands that secrete substances on to an epithelial surface by way of a duct. Examples of exocrine glands include sweat, salivary, mammary, ceruminous, lacrimal, sebaceous, prostate and mucous. Exocrine glands are one of two types of glands in the human body, the other being endocrine glands, which secrete their products directly into the bloodstream. The liver and pancreas are both exocrine and endocrine glands; they are exocrine glands because they secrete products—bile and pancreatic juice—into the gastrointestinal tract through a series of ducts, and endocrine because they secrete other substances directly into the bloodstream. Exocrine sweat glands are part of the integumentary system; they have eccrine and apocrine types.

Classification

Structure
Exocrine glands contain a glandular portion and a duct portion, the structures of which can be used to classify the gland.
 The duct portion may be branched (called compound) or unbranched (called simple).
 The glandular portion may be tubular or acinar, or may be a mix of the two (called tubuloacinar). If the glandular portion branches, then the gland is called a branched gland.

Method of secretion
Depending on how their products are secreted, exocrine glands are categorized as merocrine, apocrine, or holocrine.
 Merocrine – the cells of the gland excrete their substances by exocytosis into a duct; for example, pancreatic acinar cells, maximum sweat glands of humans, salivary glands, goblet cells, intestinal glands, tear glands, etc.
 Apocrine – the apical portion of the cytoplasm in the cell membrane, which contains the excretion, buds off. Examples are sweat glands of arm pits, pubic region, skin around anus, lips and nipples; mammary glands, etc.
 Holocrine – the entire cell disintegrates to excrete its substance; for example, sebaceous glands of the skin and nose, meibomian gland, zeis gland, etc.

Product secreted
 Serous cells secrete proteins, often enzymes. Examples include gastric chief cells and Paneth cells
 Mucous cells secrete mucus. Examples include Brunner's glands, esophageal glands, and pyloric glands
 Seromucous glands (mixed) secrete both protein and mucus. Examples include the salivary glands: although the parotid gland (saliva secretion 25%) is predominantly serous, the sublingual gland (saliva secretion 5%) mainly mucous gland, and the submandibular gland (saliva secretion 70%) is a mixed, mainly serous gland.
 Sebaceous glands secrete sebum, a lipid product. These glands are also known as oil glands, e.g. Fordyce spots and Meibomian glands.

Additional images

See also

 List of glands of the human body
 List of specialized glands within the human integumentary system

References

External links
Diagram at mhhe.com

Exocrine system